The Winemaker of Langenlois (German: Die Winzerin von Langenlois) is a 1957 Austrian romantic comedy film directed by Hans H. König and starring Herta Staal, Gunnar Möller and Paul Hörbiger.

Cast
 Herta Staal as Elisabeth Teky, Weingutsbesitzerin  
 Gunnar Möller as Jörg Strasser, Volksschullehrer  
 Paul Hörbiger as Korbinian Grammelshuber, Verwalter  
 Susi Nicoletti as Stefanie Köster, Weinhändlerin  
 Peer Schmidt as Richard Köster, ihr Neffe  
 Karl Skraup as Gerichtsvollzieher Bindinger  
 Hertha Martin as Yvonne Sommer, Schlagersängerin  
 Ingeborg Hüttinger as Anni, Wirtschafterin 
 Thomas Hörbiger as Kellergehilfe Franz  
 Karl Fochler 
 Oskar Wegrostek as Anton  
 Raoul Retzer as Rottenwieser, Barbesitzer  
 Helen Brix 
 Peter Horst 
 Brigitte Krechler 
 Günther Pregler 
 Stephan Schwartz
 Christine Kaufmann as Christl, Münchner Ferienkind

References

Bibliography 
 Robert Dassanowsky. Austrian Cinema: A History. McFarland, 2005.

External links 
 

1957 films
Austrian romantic comedy films
1957 romantic comedy films
1950s German-language films
Films about wine